MacProject was a project management and scheduling business application released along with the first Apple Macintosh systems in 1984. MacProject was one of the first major business tools for the Macintosh which enabled users to calculate the "critical path" to completion and estimate costs in money and time. If a project deadline was missed or if available resources changed, MacProject recalculated everything automatically.

MacProject was written by Debra Willrett at Solosoft, and was published and distributed by Apple Computer to promote the original Macintosh personal computer.  It was developed from an earlier application written by Debra Willrett for Apple's Lisa computer, LisaProject.  This was the first graphical user interface (GUI) for project management.  There were many other project management applications on the market at the time, but LisaProject was the first to simplify the process by allowing the user to interactively draw their project on the computer in the form of a PERT chart. Constraints could be entered for each task, and the relationships between tasks would show which ones had to be completed before a task could begin.  Given the task constraints and relationships, a "critical path", schedule and budget could be calculated dynamically using heuristic methods.

One of the early proponents of MacProject was James Halcomb, a well known expert in the use of the Critical Path Method.  Having supervised hand-drawn network diagrams for countless complex projects, Halcomb immediately recognized the promise of the WYSIWYG graphical interface and computerized calculation of the critical path.  Using a Lisa computer housed in a case designed to fit under an airplane seat, Mr. Halcomb traveled the United States demonstrating this new technology in his CPM courses. In consultation with the software's developers he authored the book Planning Big with MacProject, which introduced a generation of Mac users to PERT and CPM.

In December 1987, an updated version of MacProject, called MacProject II, was introduced as a part of Claris's move to update its suite of Mac office applications.

In 1991, Microsoft Project was ported to the Macintosh from Microsoft Windows and became MacProject's main competitor.  However, after the release of version 3.0 of Microsoft Project in 1993, Microsoft terminated support of the Macintosh release.

MacProject 1.0 is not Y2K-compliant as it cannot schedule tasks past 1999.

See also 
 MacPaint
 MacWrite
 MacDraw
 List of project management software

References 
 TidBits reviews September 1993

External links
 MacProject on Mac512.com

1984 software
Classic Mac OS-only software made by Apple Inc.
Project management software
Discontinued software